Robert Körner (21 August 1924 – 22 June 1989) was an Austrian footballer.

Club career
Körner played for and captained SK Rapid Wien, and later managed SK Rapid Wien (four times), SV Waldhof Mannheim (as coach), and 1. FC Nürnberg (as co-trainer).

International career
Körner made his debut for Austria in November 1948 against Sweden and was a participant at the 1954 FIFA World Cup where Austria finished third with his younger brother Alfred. He earned 16 caps, scoring one goal.

Honours

Player
 Austrian Football Bundesliga: 1946, 1948, 1951, 1952, 1954, 1956, 1957
 Austrian Cup: 1946
 Zentropa Cup: 1951

Managerial
 Austrian Football Bundesliga: 1960, 1964
 Austrian Cup: 1961, 1972, 1976

External links
Profile and stats - Rapid Archive
UEFA On This Day

1924 births
1989 deaths
Austrian footballers
Austria international footballers
1954 FIFA World Cup players
SK Rapid Wien players
Austrian Football Bundesliga players
Austrian football managers
SK Rapid Wien managers
Association football forwards
Austrian expatriate football managers